Tatyana Babashkina, née Motkova (born 23 November 1968) is a retired Russian high jumper.

Her personal best jump is 2.03 metres, achieved in May 1995 in Bratislava.

International competitions

See also
List of people from Yaroslavl

References

1968 births
Living people
Sportspeople from Yaroslavl
Russian female high jumpers
Olympic female high jumpers
Olympic athletes of Russia
Athletes (track and field) at the 1996 Summer Olympics
World Athletics Championships athletes for Russia
Russian Athletics Championships winners
20th-century Russian women